Marmara leptodesma is a moth of the family Gracillariidae. It is known from the New Mexico and Texas in the United States.

References

Gracillariinae
Moths described in 1928